The Miracle on the Mountain was a college football game in 2002 that took place between the Furman Paladins and Appalachian State Mountaineers on October 12. The game, which took place in Kidd Brewer Stadium, resulted in a 16–15 Appalachian State victory. The game is remembered for the botched two-point conversion attempt that cost Furman the game. It is considered one of the greatest games in Appalachian State History and the Appalachian State-Furman rivalry.

Game summary
In the fourth quarter, Furman kicked a field goal to give them a 9–7 lead. Appalachian State responded with a 24-yard touchdown pass to give the Mountaineers a 14–9 lead with 5:39 left in the game. Then Furman quarterback Billy Napier led the Paladins with a 73-yard drive capped off with a go-ahead touchdown to go up 15–14 with 7 seconds left.

Two-point conversion
Up by one point, Furman elected to go for two-points. On the attempt, Appalachian State defensive end Josh Jefferies intercepted the ball where he proceeded to run the ball to the 16-yard line before lateraling the football to cornerback Derrick Black. Black ran the ball back to the other endzone resulting in two points for the Mountaineers and giving Appalachian State a 16–15 lead. The ensuing Furman onside kick was recovered by Appalachian State and the Mountaineers won 16–15.

Scoring summary

Aftermath
When the game ended, the Appalachian State fans stormed the field. Both teams finished the season with an 8–4 record. The play was named the 6th best play of the week by SportsCenter Top 10. 247Sports named the game the 2nd best in series history. ABC named the game as its best Sports Radio Call of the Year. In October 2018, Napier returned to Kidd Brewer Stadium as his Louisiana Ragin' Cajuns were taking on Appalachian State. The Ragin' Cajuns lost 17–27. In an interview about the Miracle on the Mountain, Napier quoted, “It was a great football game, and a heck of a play by the young man."

Broadcaster call

References

American football incidents
2002 Southern Conference football season
Appalachian State Mountaineers football games
Furman Paladins football games
2002 in sports in North Carolina
October 2002 sports events in the United States